The Ministry of Civil Aviation Aerodrome Fire Service was a national airport fire service which operated in British airports run by the Ministry of Civil Aviation.

When the Ministry of Civil Aviation was established in 1946, firefighting services at its airports were originally provided by individual units at each location, answering directly to the airport manager. The following year, after a number of incidents, it was decided that this was unworkable and Sir Aylmer Firebrace, Chief of the Fire Staff of the National Fire Service, was asked to organise a national fire service for civil airports.

Unlike the local authority fire brigades, airport firemen belonged to the Transport and General Workers' Union and not the Fire Brigades Union.

Ranks
Ranks used by the Aerodrome Fire Service were:

Fireman
Leading fireman
Section leader
Aerodrome fire officer II
Aerodrome fire officer I
Divisional fire service officer
Deputy chief fire service officer
Chief fire service officer

Footnotes

References

See also

 Airport rescue and firefighting services in the United Kingdom
 Fire services in the United Kingdom

Government agencies established in 1947
Defunct fire and rescue services of the United Kingdom
Civil aviation in the United Kingdom
1947 establishments in the United Kingdom
Aviation organisations based in the United Kingdom
Aircraft rescue and firefighting